Meliacanthus cupreomarginatus is a species of beetle in the family Buprestidae, the only species in the genus Meliacanthus.

References

Monotypic Buprestidae genera